Timperley is a suburban village in the borough of Trafford, Greater Manchester, England. Historically in Cheshire, it is approximately six miles southwest of central Manchester. The population at the 2011 census was 11,061.

History
The name Timperley derives from Timber Leah, the Anglo-Saxon (Old English) for a "clearing in the forest". This can be used to roughly date the settlement of Timperley to between the 7th and 8th centuries. Timperley was a predominantly agricultural settlement before the Industrial Revolution, focusing mainly on arable crops.

The Bridgewater Canal branch from Stretford to Runcorn was built through Timperley and opened in 1776. This improvement in transport encouraged the development of market gardening in the area to serve the growing city of Manchester. The city also provided a source of night soil which was unloaded from the canal by Deansgate Lane to provide manure for farms and market gardens.

Railways

During the mid-19th century four railways were built in Timperley. The Manchester South Junction and Altrincham Railway (MSJAR) opened in 1849 with a station in Timperley on Wash Lane (now Park Road). The Warrington and Stockport Railway (W&SR) opened in 1854 from Timperley Junction just south of Timperley station on the MSJAR. It became part of the London and North Western Railway (LNWR) in 1859. The Stockport, Timperley and Altrincham Junction Railway was built through Timperley to link with the now LNWR W&S at Broadheath Junction opening in February 1866 and, from Skelton Junction, to link with the MSJAR at Deansgate Junction opening in December 1865. This became part of the Cheshire Lines Committee (CLC).

Baguley station on the CLC line also served Timperley village. Timperley curve was built in 1879 by the Manchester, Sheffield and Lincolnshire Railway (MS&LR) linking Skelton Junction with Timperley Junction. The CLC line (often referred to as the West Timperley line) from Skelton Junction to Glazebrook was opened in 1873. West Timperley railway station on this line was actually in Broadheath. The arrival of the railways in Timperley brought the middle classes from the centre of Manchester, and this is reflected by the increase of numbers in domestic services in Timperley at the same time. The impact of the railway can be seen in Timperley's growth between 1851 and 1871, more than doubling from 1,008 to 2,112.

In 1931, the MSJAR line was electrified, one of the first railway lines in Great Britain to use supply by overhead cables. A large electrical sub-station was built in connection with this just south of Timperley station. The line was converted to be part of Manchester Metrolink in 1992.

Governance
Up until the early 19th century Timperley was one of several townships in the parish of Bowdon. Timperley Parish Council was established in the 19th century. From the late 19th century Bucklow Rural District Council administered Timperley until 1936 when responsibility passed to Altrincham Urban District Council.

In 1974, Altrincham UD was merged into the new Trafford Metropolitan Borough of Greater Manchester. The ward of Timperley has three out of sixty three seats on Trafford Council, and at the 2022 local elections the three seats were held by Liberal Democrats Jane Brophy, Meena Minnis, and Will Frass. Parts of Timperley are also in Village, Broadheath and Hale Barns wards.

Since 1997, Timperley has formed part of the Altrincham and Sale West Constituency,
before that it was encompassed by the Altrincham and Sale constituency. It has been represented, since 1997, in the House of Commons by the Conservative MP, Graham Brady.

Geography
Timperley lies to the north east of Altrincham and is bounded by Fairywell Brook to the east, Hale Moss and Well Green to the south, Timperley Brook to the west and Baguley Brook to the north.

It has borders with the areas of Altrincham to the South, Sale to the North and the Manchester suburb of Wythenshawe to the East.

Areas of Timperley include :
Village (Main focal point of Timperley at the junction of Stockport Road/Thorley Lane/Park Road)
West Timperley (North West from Timperley Metrolink station towards Manchester Road)
Timperley Heyes (to North of Timperley Village and covering Grange Estate, Heyes Lane and Riddings)
Timperley Brook (West of Timperley Village, towards Altrincham)
Higher Timperley (Area to South West of Timperley Village bounded by Thorley Lane/Wood Lane)
Broomwood estate (Estate to the South of Timperley Village)

Timperley was struck by an F0/T1 tornado on 23 November 1981, as part of the record-breaking nationwide tornado outbreak on that day.

Demography

At the 2001 UK census, the village of Timperley had a total population of 11,049. The population density was 37.4 persons per hectare and for every 100 females, there were 98.8 males. Of those aged 16–74 in Timperley, 19.6% had no academic qualifications, lower than the 24.7% all of Trafford and 28.9% in England. Of the 4,473 households in Timperley, 46.8% were married couples living together, 24.9% were one-person households, 7.3% were co-habiting couples and 7.2% were lone parents.

With 94.9% being born in United Kingdom there is a low proportion of foreign-born residents. There is also a low proportion of non-white people as 97.2% of residents were recorded as white. The largest minority group was recorded as Asian at 1.1% of the population.

Economy
At the 2001 UK census, Timperley had a possible workforce of approximately 8,092 people. The town also has a low rate of unemployment (1.7%) compared with Trafford (2.7%) and England (3.3%). The Office for National Statistics estimated that during the period of April 2001 to March 2002 the average gross weekly income of households in Timperley was £640 (£33,280 per year).

According to the 2001 UK census, the industry of employment of residents in Timperley was 17.8% property and business services, 16.2% retail and wholesale, 11.9% manufacturing, 11.2% health and social work, 8.6% education, 8.0% transport and communications, 6.4% finance, 6.0% construction, 4.3% public administration and defence, 3.6% hotels and restaurants, 0.9% energy and water supply, 0.6% agriculture, and 4.2% other.

Education
Primary schools in Timperley include Broomwood Primary School, Cloverlea Primary School, Heyes Lane Primary School, Park Road Primary School, St Hugh's Catholic Primary School and Willows Primary School. Secondary schools include Altrincham College and Wellington School.

Brentwood School and Pictor School are special schools in Timperley, while Forest School is a Private school. Trafford College has a campus in West Timperley, offering further education to students from across Trafford.

Culture

Events and venues
The Altrincham and District Astronomical Society meets 10 times a year.

The South Trafford Archaeological Group (STAG) was formed in 1979 and provides facilities for volunteer archaeologists from south Manchester and north east Cheshire. The group is based near Timperley Old Hall and the clubhouse of the Altrincham Municipal Golf Course. STAG have been involved with sites such as Carrs Mill in Stalybridge; Moss Brow farm in Warburton; Moore's hat factory in Denton; the medieval hall in Urmston; and the medieval moated site of Timperley Old Hall.

Since 1984 Timperley has held a country fair on the open ground of Lark Hill by Thorley Lane. The fair, held every September (usually the second Saturday), has a variety of art, craft and charity stalls. It is organised by a small committee of local residents.

Sport
Timperley Cricket Club was founded in 1877; the club moved to its present site, near Altrincham Municipal Golf Club, in 1883. Timperley Hockey Club was formed in 1886 and became the first club in the north of England. Today Timperley Sports Club provides facilities for cricket, hockey and lacrosse. In 2006 the club was named Trafford Sports Club of the Year and Greater Manchester Sports Club of the Year.

Golf has been played on the site of Altrincham municipal golf course since 1893 when Timperley Golf Club was founded. Altrincham Golf Club offers competitive golf on a large scale. There are major competitions most weekends from April to October, and there are some major competitions during the winter months. If there are no major competitions over a weekend there is normally
a social competition.

In 1934 the owner died and the members were unable to buy the course for their own use, being outbid by Altrincham Urban Council. The course then became municipal, and the members of Timperley Golf Club decided to find a new home, moved to Baguley and built a new course. After a short stay at Baguley the club moved again and founded Mere Golf Club.

Altrincham Council continued to run the Old Hall as a clubhouse until 1955, when it was sold to Chester's Brewery and became the Old Hall Hotel. In May 2003 The Old Hall was bought by Hydes Brewery and has been converted into a Heritage Inn.

The course has remained in its original layout with only minor alterations. During World War 2 the club continued to operate, but lost the second and third holes for the production of potatoes. The present club was founded in 1935, and although the course is municipal, the club is private.

Religion

According to the 2011 UK census, the religious make up of Trafford is 63.4% Christian, 5.70% Muslim, 1.0% Hindu, 1.10% Jewish and 0.3% Buddhist. 21.2% were recorded as having no religion, 0.2% had an alternative religion and 6.3% did not state their religion. Timperley is in the Church of England Diocese of Chester with Christ Church as the parish church and Holy Cross Church as a second place of worship. Timperley is in the Roman Catholic Diocese of Shrewsbury,

Transport

The Manchester Metrolink tram network passes about 3/4-mile west of the village centre; Timperley Metrolink station is on Park Road and lies on the route between Manchester city centre and Altrincham.

Navigation Road station is located just outside Timperley in East Altrincham. It is a Northern-operated heavy rail station on the Mid-Cheshire Line with an adjoining light rail station served by the Altrincham line of the Manchester Metrolink tram network.

Present day
Today Timperley is a suburban area extending from the A56 road in the west to the main Stockport Road roundabout on the A560 in the east. Much of the housing stock dates from the 1930s and later. Typically houses are slightly larger than the traditional "northern terraces". Older houses tend to be in the red brick cottage style of north Cheshire.

Notable residents 

Ian Brown and John Squire, founders of The Stone Roses
Caroline Aherne, comedy writer and actress (The Royle Family, The Fast Show, The Mrs Merton Show), died 2016.
Roger Ashton-Griffiths, film actor (Gangs of New York, Brazil, Young Sherlock Holmes), grew up in Timperley
Paul Hanley, member of The Lovers and former member of The Fall
John Noel Nichols, wholesaler of spices and medicines and inventor of Vimto, died 1966
Louis Oosthuizen, professional golfer and winner of the 2010 British Open (one of Golf's "Majors") based in Timperley during the European season
Benny Rothman, political activist, most famous for his leading role in the mass trespass of Kinder Scout in 1932, died 2002
Chris Sievey (more popularly known as his comic character Frank Sidebottom), comedian and musician, died 2010. A statue of Sievey in his Frank Sidebottom guise was unveiled in Timperley town centre on 20 October 2013.
Cyril Washbrook, cricketer Lancashire and England, died 1999
Keith Skues, BBC radio presenter and producer, born 1939, Timperley Lodge.
John Thompson, English-born, Canadian poet, born in Timperley, 1938, died in Sackville, New Brunswick, 1976.

See also

Listed buildings in Altrincham

References

External links

Timperley Ward Profile
 Local records are kept in the Local Studies Archive of Trafford MBC
South Trafford Archaeological Group
Childminder Timperley
Timperley village site

Areas of Greater Manchester
Geography of Trafford